Ferdinand Cohen-Blind (March 25, 1844 – May 8, 1866) was a Jewish German student who attempted to assassinate Otto von Bismarck, then the Minister President of Prussia. He committed suicide shortly after his arrest.

Childhood and youth
Cohen-Blind was born in Mannheim, Grand Duchy of Baden to Jacob Abraham Cohen and his second wife Friederike, née Ettlinger.  He was the younger brother of Mathilde Blind (1841-1896), who became a well-known poet.

Shortly after her son's birth, Friederike began a relationship with journalist and revolutionary Karl Blind, a former student of the University of Heidelberg who had been expelled for expressing radical democratic sentiments. She financially supported Blind's political activities and was arrested with him in the summer of 1847. They married after Jacob Cohen's death in 1848, at which time Ferdinand's last name was changed to Cohen-Blind.

After the Baden Revolution Blind and his family went into exile, stopping in Paris and Brussels before arriving in London in 1852. A childhood in exile shaped Ferdinand; following in his parents' shoes, he rejected the monarchical system of the German states, hoping to emulate his stepfather as a champion of democracy.

Cohen-Blind returned to Germany in his 18th year, studying at the University of Tübingen and (from 1864) the Agricultural Academy of Hohenheim, where he was known as a good student.

Assassination attempt
After graduating in March 1866, Cohen-Blind went on a hike through Bavaria and Bohemia. The growing likelihood of war between Prussia and Austria led him to the decision to attempt to kill Bismarck, whom he saw as the originator of the threat of civil war. He left Carlsbad, arriving in Berlin and checking into the Hotel Royal Unter den Linden hotel on May 5. 

On the afternoon of May 7, he lay in wait for Bismarck, revolver in hand, in the Unter den Linden, a boulevard in central Berlin. The Chancellor had just reported to King Wilhelm and was now walking home. When Bismarck was close to the Russian Embassy, Cohen-Blind took aim and fired twice from behind; Bismarck spun around and grabbed his attacker, who was able to fire three more shots before soldiers from the 1st Battalion of the 2nd Guards rushed up and took him into custody. Bismarck continued on his way home. Later that night, he allowed the King's physician, Gustav von Lauer, to examine him. Lauer noted that the first three bullets had only grazed Bismarck's body and the last two had ricocheted off the ribs and had caused no major injuries.

Cohen-Blind was taken to police headquarters for questioning, but in an unguarded moment, he slashed his own throat with a knife, severing his carotid artery. He died shortly after 4 a.m. on May 8. His body was quickly buried at night without ceremony in St. Nicholas Cemetery.

Cohen-Blind's weapon, a 6-shot Lefaucheux Pepperbox-Revolver, is on display in the Bismarck-Museum in Friedrichsruh.

References 
 Julius H. Schoeps: Bismarck und sein Attentäter. Der Revolveranschlag Unter den Linden am 7. Mai 1866. Ullstein Verlag, 1984, 
 Ladislas Farago and Andrew Sinclair: "Royal Web: The Story of Princess Victoria and Frederick of Prussia". Mcgraw-Hill, 1982, 

1844 births
1866 deaths
1866 crimes in Europe
Criminals from Baden-Württemberg
Failed assassins
19th-century German Jews
People from Mannheim
University of Tübingen alumni
Suicides by sharp instrument in Germany
Otto von Bismarck
1860s suicides
German assassins